Ahmad Jahan Nuristani was an Afghan field hockey player who competed at the 1948 Summer Olympic Games, playing in all three of his team's matches.

References

External links
 

Afghan male field hockey players
Olympic field hockey players of Afghanistan
Field hockey players at the 1948 Summer Olympics
Possibly living people
Year of birth missing